Anna Bofill Leví (born 25 April 1944  in Barcelona) is a Catalan Spanish pianist, architect and composer.

Life
Anna Bofill Leví was born on 25 April 1944 in Barcelona, Spain, daughter of Catalan Emilio Bofill y Benessat, and Maria Levi, a Venetian of Jewish origin.  Her brother is the also architect Ricardo Bofill. She has two daughters and is married to María Cinta Montagut, a Spanish female writer.

She studied piano and music theory with Jordi Albareda, Xavier Montsalvatge, Josep Cercós and Josep Mestres Quadreny. She also graduated with a PhD in architecture from the Barcelona School of Architecture. From 1963 she participated in the early development of Ricardo Bofill Taller de Arquitectura (RBTA), the multidisciplinary architecture firm led by her elder brother Ricardo Bofill. She left RBTA in 1981.

Bofill continued her studies in electroacoustic music with Gabriel Luis and Callejo Brncic and computer music with Xavier Serra and Sergi Jordi at the Phonos Laboratory in Barcelona. In 1982 she attended the Conference of New Music in Sitges and took courses at the Miró Foundation with Luigi Nono, Joan Guinjoan, and Coriúnn Aharonián. In 1985 she worked at the Centre d'Études de Mathémathique et Automates Musicales (CEMAMU) in Paris, directed by Iannis Xenakis. In 1983 she translated Iannis Xenakis' book "Music and architecture" into Catalan.

Bofill has also designed sets for theater and composed music for theater works by Ricard Salvat and Mark Medoff, and other incidental music. She has collaborated with director Magda Puyo Pepe Duran, and writes professional articles. In 2009 she was honored with the Medal of Treball President Macià de la Generalitat de Catalunya.

Works
Bofill has written works for solo instruments, voice, chamber music and electroacoustic performance. Selected works include:
Esclat (1971)
Poema per pianoforte (1974)

She has published the text:
Generations of Forms: Space to Inhabit, Time to Think, 2010

References

External links
List of works

1944 births
Living people
20th-century classical composers
Spanish women classical composers
Spanish classical composers
20th-century Spanish musicians
20th-century women composers